The British Columbia Court of Appeal (BCCA) is the highest appellate court in the province of British Columbia, Canada. It was established in 1910 following the 1907 Court of Appeal Act.

Jurisdiction 
The BCCA hears appeals from the Supreme Court of British Columbia and a number of boards and tribunals. The BCCA also hears criminal appeals from the Provincial Court of British Columbia where the proceedings in that court were by indictment. It will hear summary conviction appeals from the Supreme Court on criminal matters that originated in the Provincial Court. Statute restricts appeals on civil matters from the Provincial Court (Small Claims) to the Supreme Court. However, some Provincial Court civil matters may come before the BCCA on very narrow matters having to do with questions of administrative law or other unusual circumstances.

Composition 
The BCCA consists of 15 justices (including a Chief Justice) in addition to 9 supernumerary justices. All justices of the BCCA (including the position of Chief Justice) are appointed by the federal government. The central registry for the BCCA is in Vancouver, where the BCCA holds most of its sittings. The BCCA also occasionally hears cases in Victoria, Kelowna, and Kamloops. The judges for the Court also double as judges for the Yukon Court of Appeal. Cases from Yukon are heard in both Vancouver and in Whitehorse.

A full division of the court consists of five justices; however, most cases are heard by a division of three justices. A single justice will preside over matters heard in "chambers", usually interlocutory matters or applications for leave to appeal.

Procedure 
Unlike in Ontario where a sitting of the Court of Appeal is referred to as a "panel", in the BCCA a sitting of the Court is referred to as a "division".

Counsel appearing in the BCCA are required to "gown". This court dress is identical to that worn in the Supreme Court of British Columbia, and consists of a white wing collar with tabs, along with a black bar jacket and black gown (some counsel will wear a black waistcoat and suit rather than a bar jacket). Male barristers will generally wear black or striped trousers, with female barristers wearing either trousers or a skirt.  King's Counsel wear a more elaborate bar jacket as well as a silk gown. Court dress is not required for matters heard in Chambers, wherein standard business dress can be worn by both counsel and the sitting justice.

All courts in the Province of British Columbia display the Arms of His Majesty in Right of the United Kingdom, as a symbol of its judiciary.

Courthouse 
The court moved from its previous location (what is now the Vancouver Art Gallery) to the present Arthur Erickson designed Vancouver Law Courts in 1980. One of the courtrooms from the old courthouse was reconstructed in the new building; when in session, a division of the court will often preside in this Heritage Courtroom (Courtroom 50).

Current justices 

Supernumerary

Chief justices
Since 1929, the Chief Justice of the BCCA has had the rank of Chief Justice of British Columbia.

2013–present Robert J. Bauman (13th Chief Justice)
2001–2013 Lance Finch
1988–2001 Allan McEachern
1979–1988 Nathaniel Nemetz
1973–1978 John Lauchlan Farris
1967–1972 Herbert William Davey
1964–1967 Henry Irvine Bird
1963–1964 Sherwood Lett
1958–1963 Alexander Campbell DesBrisay
1944–1957 Gordon McGregor Sloan
1942–1944 David Alexander McDonald
1940–1941 Malcolm Archibald Macdonald
1937–1940 Archer Martin
1909–1937 James Alexander MacDonald
1902–1929 Gordon Hunter

Past justices

References

External links 
 BCCA website

British Columbia courts
Canadian appellate courts
Courts and tribunals established in 1909
1909 establishments in Canada